Ba Chẽ is a district of Quảng Ninh province in the northeastern region of Vietnam. As of 2003 the district had a population of 17,335. The district covers an area of 577 km². The district capital lies at Ba Chẽ.

Administrative divisions
The district is divided into 1 township and 7 communes: Ba Chẽ, Đồn Đạc, Nam Sơn, Đạp Thanh, Minh Cầm, Lương Mông, Thanh Lâm, Thanh Sơn.

References

Districts of Quảng Ninh province